Richard Ó Fearghail was an Irish Anglican bishop in the 16th century.

He was nominated on 2 May 1541, consecrated on 22 April 1542; and died in 1553.

References

Irish Anglicans
Bishops of Ardagh (Church of Ireland)
1553 deaths
Year of birth unknown